Hermes José Quijada (16 September 1920 – 30 April 1973) was an Argentinian Navy-admiral, who was the pilot of the first airplane that had taken off from the Americas, and then landed at the South Pole.

He was born in San Miguel de Tucumán. He was killed by the Communist organization People's Revolutionary Army-22 de Agosto. Quijada was shot while he was driving his car in Buenos Aires. The airport of Río Grande, Tierra del Fuego Province is named after him.

References

1920 births
1973 deaths
Argentine Navy admirals
Argentine aviators